Titaua Juventin (also Juventin-Maurin) is an athletics administrator from French Polynesia. She is the president of the Athletics Federation of French Polynesia and represents Tahiti on the Oceania Athletics Association.

Life 
Juventin works in teacher training with the Ministry of Education in Tahiti. She adapted the International Association of Athletics Federations’ children’s athletics programme for the specific needs of French Polynesian communities and also introduced a programme aimed at getting toddlers physically active and making sport a regular part of a family lifestyle.

Juventin has served as treasurer of the Oceania Athletics Association Council for three terms and is also a member of IAAF Youth Commission.

References

Living people
People from Tahiti
Year of birth missing (living people)
Sports executives and administrators
Women sports executives and administrators
French Polynesian people in sports
Tahitian women